The Central University of Karnataka, (CUK), is a central university situated in Kadaganchi village in the Aland taluka of Kalaburagi district in the Indian state of Karnataka. It was established by an Act of the Parliament of India in 2009, "The Central Universities Act, 2009".

History

The university started operating from its permanent campus at the Gulbarga-Waghdhari inter-state highway in Aland taluka identified by the Karnataka State Government.

The Central Universities Bill 2009 aimed at creating a new central university each in Bihar, Gujarat, Haryana, Himachal Pradesh, Jammu and Kashmir, Jharkhand, Karnataka, Kerala, Orissa, Punjab, Rajasthan and Tamil Nadu. It also sought to convert Guru Ghasidas Vishwavidyalaya in Chhattisgarh, Harisingh Gour Vishwavidyalaya in Sagar (Madhya Pradesh) and Hemwati Nandan Bahuguna Garhwal University in Uttarakhand into Central universities.

Schools and Departments
 School of Business Studies
 Department of Business Studies
 Department of Commerce
 Department of Economic Studies and Planning
 Department of Tourism and Hotel Management
 School of Earth Sciences 
 Department of Geography
 Department of Geology
 School of Education and Training
 School of Humanities and Languages
 Department of English
 Department of Hindi
 Department of Kannada Literature and Culture
 Department of Linguistics
 Department of Foreign Language Studies
 Department of Music and Fine Arts
 School of Social and Behavioral Sciences
 Department of History & Archaeology
 Department of Psychology
 Department of Public Administration
 Department of Social Work
 Department of Folklore and Tribal Studies
 School of Media Studies
 Department of Journalism and Mass Communication
 School of Computer Science
 Department of Computer Science
 School of Chemical Sciences
 Department of Chemistry
 School of Life Sciences
 Department of Life Sciences
 School of Physical Sciences
 Department of Mathematics
 Department of Physics
 School of Engineering
 Department of Electrical Engineering
 Department of Electronics and Communication Engineering
 School of Legal Jurisprudence Studies
 Department of Law

See also
Central University, India

References

External links
Official website

Education in Kalaburagi
Central universities in India
Universities in Karnataka
Universities and colleges in Kalaburagi district
2009 establishments in Karnataka
Educational institutions established in 2009
Companies based in Kalaburagi
Organisations based in Kalaburagi